100 Years of Nine Lessons and Carols is a double album by the Choir of King's College, Cambridge released to mark 100 years since the first festival of nine lessons and carols service was held in King's College Chapel, Cambridge. One disc contains recordings of live performances from the BBC Radio broadcasts of the services from the period 1958 to 2017,  while the second contains newly recorded versions of works previously performed at the service.

The album debuted at number 1 in the UK Classical music chart on 22 November 2018, a position it retained for 9 weeks.

Track listing

References

2018 classical albums